Queen for a Day was an American radio and television game show.

Queen for a Day may also refer to:

Music
"Queen for a Day", a song by Donna Summer from the 1977 album Once Upon a Time
"Queen for a Day" (Parts 1 & 2), two songs by Blackmore's Night from the 2003 album Ghost of a Rose
"Queen for a Day", a song by Dance Hall Crashers from the 1995 album Lockjaw
Queen for a Day, a 2016 album by Anouk

Film and television
 Queen for a Day (film), a 1951 film based on the show.
 "Queen for a Day", from the American television series Arrested Development.
 "Queens for a Day", the third episode in the American television series Ugly Betty.
"Queen for a Day", Episode 12 of Totally Spies!.
"Queen for a Day", Episode 16 of Tangled: The Series.
"Queen for a Day", a 1995 television special of the PBS show Shining Time Station.

Other
 Proffer letter or "Queen for a Day" letter, allowing a defendant or witness to give information to a prosecutor